

World Championships

The World Road Championships was held in Florence, Italy.

Grand Tours

UCI World Tour

2.HC Category Races

1.HC Category Races

UCI tours

Continental Championships

African Championships

Asian Championships

European Championships (under-23)

Oceania Championships

Pan American Championships

International Games

Games of the Small States of Europe

Island Games

Mediterranean Games

East Asian Games

Southeast Asian Games

National Championships

UCI Teams

UCI ProTeams

UCI Professional Continental and Continental teams

References

See also
2013 in women's road cycling

 

Men's road cycling by year